is a former Japanese football player. He played for Japan national team.

Club career
Sekiguchi was born in Saitama on October 29, 1954. After graduating from high school, he joined his local club Mitsubishi Motors in 1973. In 1973, the club won the champions Japan Soccer League and Emperor's Cup. In 1978, the club won all three major title in Japan; Japan Soccer League, JSL Cup and Emperor's Cup. In 1980s, the club also won 1980 Emperor's Cup, 1981 JSL Cup and 1982 Japan Soccer League. He retired in 1988. He played 153 games and scored 36 goals in the league.

National team career
On May 23, 1978, Sekiguchi debuted for Japan national team against Thailand. In July, he also played for Japan. He played 3 games and scored 1 goal for Japan in 1978.

Club statistics

National team statistics

References

External links
 
 Japan National Football Team Database

1954 births
Living people
Association football people from Saitama Prefecture
Japanese footballers
Japan international footballers
Japan Soccer League players
Urawa Red Diamonds players
Association football forwards